The plunder of Old Delhi took place on 10 March 1753.

Background
The Mughal emperor had taken back the domain of Awadh and Allahabad from Safdar Jang, and to avenge his humiliation, Safdar Jang rebelled and attacked Delhi.

Battle
On 13 May Safdar Jang was dismissed as wazir and appointed in his place Intixam, with Imad as Mir Bakshi. On Suraj's advice, Safdar Jang reacted by appointing Akbar Ādilshāh as emperor. On 14 May the Jats sacked Chārbāg, Bāg-e-kultāt and Hakīm Munīm Bridge, and the next day Jaisinghpura, burning several areas. On 16 May the Jats attacked Delhi and defeated Sādil Khan and Raja Devidatta in a battle. On 17 May, the Jats captured Feroz Shah Kotla. In the fight against the rohillas, the Jats rode bulls and threw cannonballs with bare hands. Najib Khan was wounded and 400 Rohilla pathans died.

Aftermath
Imad-ul-Mulk being the de facto ruler of Delhi called for help from the Marathas and instigated them to attack Jat territory.
The Marathas laid siege over the Kumher fort on 1 January 1754. Suraj Mal fought with bravery and gave strong resistance. The Marathas were unable to capture the Kumher fort.

See also
 Battle of Delhi (disambiguation)
 Capture of Delhi (1771)

References

External links
 Suraj Mal at Britannica

Delhi 1753
1757 in India
18th century in Delhi
Delhi 1753
Battles involving the Jats